Skull and crossbones is a symbol of a human skull with two long bones crossed below it. Probably the most common use of the term is as an alternative name for the Jolly Roger, a naval ensign (flag) flown to identify a pirate ship about to attack, which commonly includes the skull and crossbones symbol.

Otherwise it may refer to:
Skull and crossbones (symbol), as a symbol of death and especially as a memento mori on tombstones, a warning symbol of poisonous substances and danger
Skull and crossbones (military), in variations used by several military forces
Skull and crossbones (fraternities and sports), used also by secret societies
Skull and crossbones (Spanish cemetery), "campo santo", used to mark the entrances to cemeteries
Skull & Crossbones (video game), 1987 video game by Atari Games
 , a Unicode code point in the Miscellaneous Symbols block

Skull and Bones may refer to:
Skull and Bones, a secret society at Yale University
Skull & Bones (album), by the rap group Cypress Hill
Skull & Bones (video game), upcoming video game by Ubisoft
Skull & Bones (band), power metal band from Argentina

See also
 Crossbones (disambiguation)